The Heraldry Society of New Zealand, established in 1962, is the principal New Zealand learned society concerned with the scholarly study of heraldry.

Operationally and constitutionally, it is completely independent of The Heraldry Society in England. It was known as The Heraldry Society (New Zealand Branch) until November 2007.

It publishes a quarterly journal, The New Zealand Armorist, and its present patron is Dame Cindy Kiro , 22nd Governor-General of New Zealand. The current president of the Society is Colin Davis.

See also

 New Zealand heraldry
 Heraldry societies

References

External links
The Heraldry Society of New Zealand
The Heraldry Society (in England)

Heraldic societies
1962 establishments in New Zealand
Learned societies of New Zealand
Organizations established in 1962
New Zealand heraldry